The Southern red muntjac (Muntiacus muntjak)  is a deer species native to Southeast Asia. It is formely known as the Indian muntjac or the common muntjac before the species was taxonomically revised to represent only populations of Sunda and perhaps Malaysia. The other populations being attributed to this species are now attributed to Muntiacus vaginalis (Northern red muntjac). Muntjacs are also referred to as barking deer. It is listed as Least Concern on the IUCN Red List. 

This muntjac has soft, short, brownish or grayish hair, sometimes with creamy markings. It is among the smallest deer species. It is an omnivore and eats grass, fruit, shoots, seeds, bird eggs, and small animals, and occasionally scavenges on carrion. Its calls sound like barking, often when frightened by a predator, hence the common name "barking deer". Males have canines, short antlers that usually branch just once near the base, and a large postorbital scent gland used to mark territories.

Name

Characteristics

The Southern red muntjac has a short but very soft, thick, dense coat that is more dense in cooler regions. Its face is darker and the limbs are dark to reddish brown and the coat color seasonally varies from darker brown to yellowish and grayish brown and is white ventrally. Its ears have much less hair, but otherwise are the same color as the rest of the head. Females have tufts of fur and small bony knobs instead of antlers. Males also have elongated, slightly curved upper canines, which can be used in male-male conflicts and inflict serious injury. Muntjacs are unique among the deer, having large, obvious facial (preorbital, in front of the eyes) scent glands used to mark territories or to attract females. Males have larger glands than females.

Distribution and habitat

The southern red muntjac (previously known as the common muntjac) is one the least known mammals of Southeast Asia. It is found in the Malay Peninsula, Sumatra, Java, Bali and Borneo. It is also assumed to be present in peninsular Thailand and southwestern Myanmar. It is extinct in Singapore.M. muntjak is a terrestrial mammal that live in forests and is resilient to changes in it's habitat.

Distribution of subspecies (MSW3) 

There were 15 subspecies included under the species in MSW3 :
M. m. annamensis, Indochina
M. m. aureus, peninsular India
M. m. bancanus, Belitung and Bangka Islands
M. m. curvostylis, Thailand
M. m. grandicornis, Burmese muntjac, Burma
M. m. malabaricus, South India and Sri Lanka
M. m. montanus, Sumatran or mountain muntjac, Sumatra
M. m. muntjak, Javan muntjac, Java and south Sumatra
M. m. nainggolani, Bali and Lombok Islands
M. m. nigripes, black-footed or black-legged muntjac, Vietnam and Hainan Island
M. m. peninsulae, Malaysia
M. m. pleicharicus, South Borneo
M. m. robinsoni, Bintan Island and Lingga Islands
M. m. rubidus, north Borneo
M. m. vaginalis, Burma to southwest China

Distribution of subspecies (IUCN and MDD) 

1-2 of them have since been elevated to species status : M. malabaricus and M. vaginalis (northern red muntjac).

The subspecies bancanus, montanus, muntjak, nainggolani, peninsulae, pleiharicus, robinsoni, rubidus are included in the southern red muntjak (M. muntjak), while annamensis, aureus, curvostylis, grandicornis, nigripes are included in the northern red muntjac (M. vaginalis).

Ecology and behavior

The Southern red muntjac is also called "barking deer" due to the bark-like sound that it makes as an alarm when danger is present. Other than during the rut (mating season) and for the first six months after giving birth, the adult muntjac is a solitary animal. Adult males in particular are well spaced and marking grass and bushes with secretions from their preorbital glands appears to be involved in the acquisition and maintenance of territory. Males acquire territories that they mark with scent markers by rubbing their preorbital glands (located on their face, just below the eyes) on the ground and on trees, scraping their hooves against the ground, and scraping the bark of trees with their lower incisors. These scent markers allow other muntjacs to know whether a territory is occupied or not. Males often fight with each other over these territories, sufficient vegetation, and for primary preference over females when mating using their short antlers and an even more dangerous weapon, their canines. If a male is not strong enough to acquire his own territory, it will most likely to fall victim to a predator. During the time of the rut, territorial lines are temporarily disregarded and overlap, while males roam constantly in search of a receptive female.

Predators of these deer include tigers, leopards, clouded leopards, pythons, crocodiles, dholes, Asiatic black bears, fishing cats, Asian golden cats and golden jackals. Foxes, raptors and wild boars prey on fawns. They are highly alert creatures. When put into a stressful situation or if a predator is sensed, muntjacs begin making a bark-like sound. Barking was originally thought of as a means of communication between the deer during mating season, as well as an alert.

Reproduction
The Southern red muntjacs are polygamous animals. Females become sexually mature during their first to second year of life. These females are polyestrous, with each cycle lasting about 14 to 21 days and an estrus lasting for 2 days. The gestation period is 6–7 months and they usually bear one offspring at a time, but sometimes produce twins. Females usually give birth in dense growth so that they are hidden from the rest of the herd and predators. The young leaves its mother after about 6 months to establish its own territory. Males often fight between one another for possession of a harem of females. Muntjacs are distinguished from other even-toed ungulates in showing no evidence of a specific breeding season within the species. Adults exhibit relatively large home range overlap both intersexually and intrasexually, meaning that strict territorialism did not occur but some form of site-specific dominance exists.

Evolution and genetics

Paleontological evidence proves that Southern red muntjacs have been around since the late Pleistocene epoch at least 12,000 years ago. Scientists are interested in studying muntjacs because between species, they have a wide variation in number of chromosomes; in fact, the southern red muntjac has the lowest recorded number of chromosomes of any mammal, with males having a diploid number of 7 and females having 6 chromosomes. They are the oldest known members of the deer family, and the earliest known deer-like creatures had horns instead of antlers, but the muntjac is the earliest known species to actually have antlers. Ancestor to muntjacs is the Dicrocerus elegans, which is the oldest known deer to shed antlers. Other fossils found that deer species experienced a split of the Cervinae from the Muntiacinae, the latter of which remained of similar morphology. Muntjacs of this time during the Miocene were smaller than their modern counterparts. Molecular data have suggested that Southern red muntjacs and Fea's muntjacs share a common ancestor, while giant muntjacs are more closely related to Reeve's muntjac. Although the muntjac deer has a long lineage, little has been studied in terms of their fossil record. The female Southern red muntjac deer is the mammal with the lowest recorded diploid number of chromosomes, where 2n = 6. The male has a diploid number of seven chromosomes. In comparison, the similar Reeves's muntjac (M. reevesi) has a diploid number of 46 chromosomes.

Threats

Most muntjacs species have played a major role in Southeastern Asia, being hunted for sport and for their meat and skin. Often, these animals are hunted around the outskirts of agricultural areas, as they are considered a nuisance for damaging crops and ripping bark from trees.

References

Further reading

Muntjac
Mammals of South Asia
Mammals of Southeast Asia
Southern red muntjac
Taxa named by Eberhard August Wilhelm von Zimmermann